(October 22, 1197 – October 7, 1242) was the 84th emperor of Japan, according to the traditional order of succession. His reign spanned the years from 1210 through 1221.

Genealogy

He was the third son of Emperor Go-Toba.  His mother was Shigeko (重子), the daughter of Fujiwara Hanki (藤原範季)
Empress (chūgū): Kujō Fujiwara no Ritsushi (?) (九条（藤原）立子) later Higashiichijō-in (東一条院), Kujo Yoshitsune’s daughter
Second daughter: Imperial Princess Taiko (諦子内親王; 1217-1243) later Gekgimon’in (明義門院)
Third son: Imperial Prince Kanenari (懐成親王) later Emperor Chūkyō

Lady-in-waiting: Toku-Naishi (督典侍), Fujiwara Norimitsu’s Daughter
Fourth son: Prince Hikonari (彦成王; 1219-1286)
Sixth son: Imperial Prince Yoshimune (善統親王; 1233-1317)

Consort: Fujiwara Noriko (藤原位子), Bomon Nobukiyo’s daughter 
 First Daughter: Imperial Princess Jōko (穠子内親王; 1216-1279）later Eianmon’in（永安門院)

Consort: Fujiwara Kiyotaka’s Daughter
 First Son: Imperial Prince Priest Sonkaku (尊覚法親王; 1215-1264)
 Second Son: Imperial Prince Priest Kaku‘e (覚恵法親王; b.1217)
 Fifth son: Prince Iwakura no Miya Tadanari (岩倉宮忠成王; 1222-1279)

 Consort: Saishō-no-Tsubone (宰相局), Priest’s daughter
 Son: Kangan Giin

Mother unknown:
 Daughter: Princess Yoshiko (慶子女王; 1225-1286）
 Daughter: Princess Tadako (忠子女王; 1232-1249）
 Son: Prince Chitose (千歳宮; 1237-1254）

Events of Juntoku's life
Morinari-shinnō became Crown Prince in 1200. He was elevated to the throne after Emperor Go-Toba pressured Emperor Tsuchimikado into abdicating.

 1210 (Jōgen 1, 25th day of the 11th month): In the 12th year of Tsuchimikado-tennōs reign (土御門天皇十二年), the emperor abdicated; and the succession (‘‘senso’’) was received by his younger brother, the second son of the former-Emperor Go-Toba.  Shortly thereafter, Emperor Juntoku is said to have acceded to the throne (‘‘sokui’’).

In actuality, Emperor Go-Toba wielded effective power as a cloistered emperor during the years of Juntoku's reign.

In 1221, he was forced to abdicate because of his participation in Go-Toba's unsuccessful attempt to displace the Kamakura bakufu with re-asserted Imperial power.  This political and military struggle was called the Jōkyū War or the Jōkyū Incident (Jōkyū-no ran).

After the Jōkyū-no ran, Juntoku was sent into exile on Sado Island (佐渡島 or 佐渡ヶ島, both Sadogashima), where he remained until his death in 1242.

This emperor is known posthumously as Sado-no In (佐渡院) because his last years were spent at Sado. He was buried in a mausoleum,  the Mano Goryo,  on Sado's west coast.  Juntoku's official Imperial tomb (misasagi) is in Kyoto.

Juntoku was tutored in poetry by Fujiwara no Sadaie, who was also known as Teika.  One of the emperor's poems was selected for inclusion in what became a well-known anthology, the Ogura Hyakunin Isshu.  This literary legacy in Teika's collection of poems has accorded Juntoku a continuing popular prominence beyond the scope of his other lifetime achievements.  The poets and poems of the Hyakunin isshu form the basis for a card game (uta karuta) which is still widely played today.

Kugyō
Kugyō (公卿) is a collective term for the very few most powerful men attached to the court of the Emperor of Japan in pre-Meiji eras.

In general, this elite group included only three to four men at a time.  These were hereditary courtiers whose experience and background would have brought them to the pinnacle of a life's career.  During juntoku's reign, this apex of the  Daijō-kan included:
 Kampaku, Konoe Iezane, d. 1242.
 Sadaijin
 Udaijin
 Nadaijin
 Dainagon

Eras of Juntoku's reign

The years of Juntoku's reign are more specifically identified by more than one era name or nengō.
 Jōgen       (1207–1211)
 Kenryaku          (1211–1213)
 Kempō (1213–1219)
 Jōkyū       (1219–1222)

Ancestry

See also
 Emperor of Japan
 List of Emperors of Japan
 Imperial cult

Notes

References

 Bornoff, Nicholas. (2005). National Geographic Traveler Japan. Washington, D.C.: National Geographic Society.
 Brown, Delmer M. and Ichirō Ishida, eds. (1979). [ Jien, c. 1220], Gukanshō (The Future and the Past, a translation and study of the Gukanshō, an interpretative history of Japan written in 1219). Berkeley: University of California Press. 
 Mostow, Joshua S., ed. (1996). Pictures of the Heart: The Hyakunin Isshu in Word and Image. Honolulu: University of Hawaii Press. 
 Ponsonby-Fane, Richard Arthur Brabazon. (1959).  The Imperial House of Japan. Kyoto: Ponsonby Memorial Society. OCLC 194887
 Titsingh, Isaac, ed. (1834). [Siyun-sai Rin-siyo/Hayashi Gahō, 1652], Nipon o daï itsi ran; ou, Annales des empereurs du Japon.]  Paris: Oriental Translation Fund of Great Britain and Ireland.
 Varley, H. Paul , ed. (1980). [ Kitabatake Chikafusa, 1359], Jinnō Shōtōki  ([https://books.google.com/books?id=tVv6OAAACAAJ&dq=A+Chronicle+of+Gods+and+Sovereigns:+Jinn%C5%8D+Sh%C5%8Dt%C5%8Dki+of+Kitabatake+Chikafusa&lr=  A Chronicle of Gods and Sovereigns: Jinnō Shōtōki. New York: Columbia University Press. 

 
 

Japanese emperors
1197 births
1242 deaths
Emperor Juntoku
Emperor Juntoku
Emperor Juntoku
12th-century Japanese people
13th-century Japanese monarchs
Hyakunin Isshu poets
Deified Japanese people